is a Japanese politician. She is a member of the House of Councillors, the upper house of the National Diet of Japan. She was first elected to the House of Councillors in 2010 and was re-elected in 2016. Prior to that, she was a member of the Tochigi Prefectural Assembly for two terms. She belongs to the Liberal Democratic Party and The Party for Japanese Kokoro. Ueno is affiliated to the revisionist lobby Nippon Kaigi.

References

External links

1958 births
Female members of the House of Councillors (Japan)
Members of Nippon Kaigi
Members of the House of Councillors (Japan)
Living people
Politicians from Tochigi Prefecture